Nowa TV is a Polish television channel, launched on November 9, 2016.

On December 4, 2017, Polsat announced that it had bought 34 percent shares of TV Spektrum, which is the broadcaster of Fokus TV and Nowa TV.

Programming
Nowa TV is a general channel, therefore the programming schedule comprises various programs - movies, series, documentaries, entertainment, news and current affairs.

News/current affairs
 24 godziny (24 hours) - news programme broadcast daily at 18:30, hosted by Beata Tadla, Joanna Dunikowska, Marek Czyż and Jarosław Kulczycki
 Więc jak? (So how?) - talk-show, hosted by Sławomir Jastrzębowski, editor-in-chief of Super Express

Series
 Mercy Street
 The Tudors (Dynastia Tudorów)
 Hell on Wheels
 The Bold and the Beautiful (Moda na sukces) - of the 6365. episode (6150. in Polish numbering)
 Drop Dead Diva (Jej Szerokość Afrodyta)
 Bomb Girls (Bombowe dziewczyny)
 Transporter: The Series (Transporter)
 No Limit
 Caïn (Detektyw Cain)
 Profilage (Profil)
 Joséphine, ange gardien (Józefinka)
 La Nouvelle Maud (Szepty przeszłości)
 Avenida Brasil (Zranione uczucie)

References

External links
 

Television channels in Poland
Television channels and stations established in 2016
2016 establishments in Poland
Polish-language television stations
Mass media in Warsaw